Charaxes bernstorffi is a butterfly in the family Nymphalidae. It is found in Yemen. The habitat consists of dry savanna.

References

External links
 African Charaxes/Charaxes Africains  Eric Vingerhoedt as synonym for Charaxes kheili
 Charaxes bernstorffi images at  Consortium for the Barcode of Life 
African Butterfly Database Range map via search

Butterflies described in 1982
bernstorffi
Endemic fauna of Yemen